Anglo-Saxon cemeteries have been found in England, Wales and Scotland. The burial sites date primarily from the fifth century to the seventh century AD, before the Christianisation of Anglo-Saxon England.  Later Anglo-Saxon period cemeteries have been found with graves dating from the 9th to the 11th century. Burials include both inhumation and cremation. Inhumation burials before the late seventh century when pagan funerary rituals were the norm, often consisted of rectangular graves, with coffins or were lined with stones. High status burials, often held burial furniture, predominantly burial beds. Grave goods were often placed with the body, and included jewellery, especially Anglo-Saxon brooches, weapons, tools, and household items.

List of Anglo Saxon Cemeteries 
This is a partial list of Anglo-Saxon Cemeteries.

External links
 Anglo- Saxon treatment of older women during burial
The Ghostly Treasure Ship of Sutton Hoo
1,300-year-old Anglo-Saxon cross presented to Cambridge museum

See also
Burial in Anglo-Saxon England
Bed burial
List of Anglo-Saxon bed burials
Sutton Hoo

Further reading

Worthy Park

Berinsfield

References

Anglo-Saxon
Anglo-Saxon cemeteries